Central Armagh may refer to:

The central part of County Armagh
Central Armagh (Northern Ireland Parliament constituency)